The 1908–09 Australia rugby union tour of the British Isles was a collection of friendly rugby union games undertaken by the Australia national rugby union team against invitational and national teams from England and Wales, as well as several games against sides from North America. This was the first Australian tour of the Northern Hemisphere and the side is sometimes referred to as the "First Wallabies".

Both the New Zealand and South African teams had toured Europe in 1905 and 1906 respectively, both achieving unexpected but deserved success against club and international opposition. Despite the success of these two touring teams, Australia suffered poor press and with only a single win after the teams' first twelve international matches in its history to that point, few people suggested the team would do well. Against low expectations the Australians played well, winning 25 of 31 matches played on the tour and with some commentators writing that the team would have achieved better results if they had not picked up so many injuries.

Australia took in two recognised international games, against Wales and England, but failed to play any games in Scotland or Ireland due to the Irish and Scottish Unions resenting the International Rugby Board's attitude regarding the Australian invitation.

The squad's leadership

Tour manager, who performed the role of coach was New South Wales state selector James McMahon, a veteran of the early NSWRU representative fixtures of 1889 and 1894 against New Zealand. He was assisted by Stan Wickham who had captained the Wallabies on 10 occasions between 1904 and 1905. Tour captain was Dr. Herbert 'Paddy' Moran. The team was also captained in matches during the tour by Chris McKivat and by Fred Wood, the tour vice-captain. They played in blue shirts, emblazoned with the Waratah. Players were paid 3 shillings a day in expenses.

Moran writes in Viewless Winds that when the touring squad first arrived at Plymouth a pack of journalists were there who were anxious to give the team some distinctive name. The "Rabbits" was instantaneously rejected and soon after the team adopted the moniker of "The Wallabies" which for many years was used to describe the Australia national rugby union team when touring to Britain. These days the national side are the Wallabies whether playing at home or anywhere abroad.

Moran also describes as "an affliction" the war-cry which the parent Union in Australia had suggested the team should use for its "box-office value". Moran wrote:

Echoing the feelings of the Australian team towards the war-cry, there was little respect shown from their opponents towards it either. In the encounter with Cardiff at the Cardiff Arms Park, Percy Bush responded to the cry by charging onto the pitch brandishing a sword and shield, in what was intended to be an amusing riposte.

Tour itinerary

The squad left Sydney on 8 August 1908 on board the SS Omrah bound for Melbourne.  The ship contained 116 passengers, 1579 bales of wool, 2729 carcasses of mutton, 4650 carcasses of lamb, 2000 quarters of beef, 4800 crates of frozen rabbits and 200 tonnes of lead and copper. They played a game at the MCG against a Victorian XV which was won 26–6. They docked in Fremantle and played and won a fixture against a Western Australian XV 58–6.

On the long voyage Moran introduced the practice of team meetings that were part lecture and part brain–storming with players encouraged to voice their ideas on improving team performance. Moran stood at a blackboard and while his lecturing style was initially derided by the players he managed to instill a sense of cleverness and skill in players, creating thoughts of rugby as similar to a game of chess. The Sydney forward Cecil Murnin became ill on the voyage and left the tour in Naples to return to Australia.

The first tour match in England was against Devon. Peter Burge broke a leg in that match and did not play again on the tour. Australia won the match with fourteen men. Bob Craig had brought a carpet snake in his luggage as a tour mascot and the snake died that same day. The fourth tour match saw the Wallabies pitted against the best players from Cardiff and Swansea playing as Glamorgan County. The match at Pontypridd drew a crowd of 20,000 who gave the visitors a standing ovation. In that match another player was lost to a broken leg – this time from the sideline. The Queensland forward Flanagan was running the flag as line–umpire and collided with the winger "Boxer" Russell. Australia's first loss was the ninth match, against Llanelli RFC – a spirited encounter which saw the Llanelli side win the match 8–3 and themselves a place in local sporting folklore.

Olympic Wallabies
During the tour, the Olympic Games were being held in London. The Australian team entered the rugby tournament and were the only other team alongside Cornwall, who were representing Great Britain.  The interest in the Olympic rugby final was only lukewarm with the final being held in the last week of Games that had taken place over six months.

Australia had already beaten Cornwall, the British county champions early in the tour. Scottish and Irish Unions had turned down the RFU's invitation to participate in the Olympic bouts. France were expected to contest the medal, but had withdrawn, leaving just Australia and Cornwall for England team to play for gold and silver medals.

The match was played on an area alongside the Olympic Games swimming pool which measured 110 yards in length with a long line of netting stretched beside to catch flying balls. Large mattresses were spread along the rim of the pool to prevent injuries to falling players. One day was allocated to what was called the Olympic rugby tournament. Neither Moran, nor the tour vice-captain Fred Wood played so Chris McKivat led the Wallabies to an easy 32–3 victory and to Olympic glory, with each Wallaby in that match thereafter an Olympic gold medallist.

Tour statistics
The tour took in 31 games in the British Isles, with the Australians winning 25, losing five and drawing one. Of the Test matches, the team lost against Wales, but beat England. These matches were the first ever encounters between an Australian team and their hosts. A further two matches were played in Australia en route and there were five matches in the US and Canada.

The Wallabies scored 438 points on tour to 149 against, scoring 104 tries in the process and averaging better than three tries per game with 80 scored by the backs and 24 by the forwards.

Touring party

Management
Manager: James McMahon
Assistant: Stan Wickham
Captain: Herbert Moran
Vice-Captain: Fred Wood

Full backs
Phil Carmichael (Brothers)
 William Dix (Armidale)

Three-quarters
Charles Russell (Newtown)
Daniel Carroll (St. George)
Jack Hickey (Glebe)
Frank Smith (Central West)
 H.L. Daly (Central West)
 Edward Mandible (Sydney)
 Esmond Parkinson (Harlin)

Half backs
Christopher McKivatt (Glebe)
Arthur McCabe (South Sydney)
Fred Wood (Glebe)
Ward Prentice (West Suburbs)
 Joseph M Stevenson (Northern)

Forwards
 Thomas Griffen (Glebe)
 Jumbo Barnett (Newtown)
 Patrick McCue (Newtown)
 Sydney Middleton (Glebe)
 Tom Richards (Charters Towers)
 Malcolm McArthur (Eastern Suburbs)
 Charles McMurtrie (Orange)
 Robert Craig (Balmain)
 Herbert Moran (Newcastle)
 E. McIntyre (Central West)
 Ken Gavin (Central West)
 Albert Burge (South Sydney)
 Peter Burge (South Sydney)
 Cecil Murnin (Eastern Suburbs)
 Norm Row (Eastern Suburbs)
 Peter Flanagan (Brothers)
 Charles Hammand (University)

Match summary
Complete list of matches played by Australia at British Isles and North America:

 Test matches

Notes

Test matches

Wales

After the tours by the New Zealand and South African teams, the Welsh crowds were beginning to become fatigued at greeting another 'colonial' team, and the crowd of 30,000 at the Cardiff Arms Park was smaller than previous in tours. Those that attended were repaid with an exciting and close encounter, with two tries from both sides and Wales winning by just a single penalty goal. The contest between the forwards was described as 'tremendous', and at the end of the match Moran was chaired from the ground by the Welsh supporters. Moran was later quoted as saying: "It was a very gruelling game; in fact, I think it was one of the hardest games I had ever played in."

Moran describes the last fifteen minutes as tremendously hard. Twice or three times the Australian backs either crossed the line or knocked down a corner post without being able to score. In the dying moments one of the Australian wingers made a break with just Bert Winfield to beat. Instead of stepping or fending him the Wallaby three-quarter attempted to barge through and both players collapsed to the ground. The whistle blew and the Test was Wales'.

England

The match was to have been played at Twickenham but bad weather had delayed the construction of the stand and it was moved to Blackheath.

England had ten new caps, including all four three-quarters. England started well and Edgar Mobbs scored. Wallaby Norman Row kicked an up-and-under, followed up and scored to level the scores. Half-time came at 3-all. Australia dominated the second half. Boxer Russell scored the Wallabies' second and third tries.

Although the Australian team won by three tries to one, sections of the British press reported that the tourists were fortunate to win. This was typical of the press, which had unfairly compared the Australians to the All Black and Springbok teams throughout the tour. Moran had suffered an Achilles-tendon injury in a prior match and missed the England encounter, so the captaincy was given to McKivat.

References

Footnotes

Bibliography
 
 
 
 Collection (1995) Gordon Bray presents The Spirit of Rugby, Harper Collins Publishers Sydney
 Davis, JC (1934) Every Man for the Ship (NSWRU Souvenir Publication, 1934 reproduced in The Spirit of Rugby, 1995)
 Howell, Max (2005) Born to Lead – Wallaby Test Captains, Celebrity Books, Auckland NZ
 
 Zavos, Spiro (2000) Golden Wallabies Penguin Sydney

Online
Chris Thau article A Century of Wallaby Touring
Eng v Aust match report at Planet-Rugby.com

1908 rugby union tours
1909 rugby union tours
1908–09
1908–09
1908–09
1908–09
1908–09
1908–09
1908 in Australian rugby union
1909 in Australian rugby union
1908–09 in English rugby union
1908–09 in Welsh rugby union
1909 in Canadian rugby union
1908–09 in British rugby union